Aston Arena (formerly Aston Villa Leisure Centre and Aston Events Centre) was an indoor sports and event venue located in Birmingham, England.

The venue was situated adjacent to Villa Park, home of Aston Villa F.C. of the Premier League.

The venue played host to many sporting events, and was the home of the basketball teams Birmingham Bullets, Birmingham Athletics and Birmingham Panthers.

Artists that performed at the venue include Bob Dylan, Black Sabbath, Paul Weller, Nirvana, Manic Street Preachers, The B52's and Morrissey, among others.

References

Basketball venues in England
Sports venues in Birmingham, West Midlands